Fister is a former municipality in Rogaland county, Norway.  The  municipality existed from 1884 until 1965.  It was located in what is now the present-day municipalities of Stavanger and Hjelmeland.  The administrative centre of the municipality was the village of Fister, where the Fister Church is located.  The municipality encompassed the western coast of mainland along the Fisterfjorden plus the islands to the west of the mainland, including the western part of Randøy and Halsnøya.

History
The municipality of Fister was established on 1 July 1884 when the municipality of Hjelmeland og Fister was divided into two municipalities: Hjelmeland and Fister. Initially, Fister had 832 residents.  

During the 1960s, there were many municipal mergers across Norway due to the work of the Schei Committee. On 1 January 1965, the municipality of Fister was dissolved.  The western part of Fister, known as the Fister islands, (population: 246) was merged into the municipality of Finnøy.  The eastern part of Fister which included part of Randøy island and the mainland part of the municipality (population: 467) was merged with Hjelmeland and Årdal municipalities to form the new, larger municipality of Hjelmeland.

Government
All municipalities in Norway, including Fister, are responsible for primary education (through 10th grade), outpatient health services, senior citizen services, unemployment and other social services, zoning, economic development, and municipal roads.  The municipality is governed by a municipal council of elected representatives, which in turn elects a mayor.

Municipal council
The municipal council  of Fister was made up of representatives that were elected to four year terms.  The party breakdown of the final municipal council was as follows:

See also
List of former municipalities of Norway

References

Hjelmeland
Stavanger
Former municipalities of Norway
1884 establishments in Norway
1965 disestablishments in Norway